The Müggelberge (also formerly called the Müggelsberge) are a wooded line of hills with heights up to  in the southeast of Berlin's Treptow-Köpenick quarter. They are dominated by the Kleiner Müggelberg (88.3 m) and Großer Müggelberg (114.7 m). The Müggelberge cover an area of around seven square kilometres. The ridge was formed during the ice age.

A viewing tower called the Müggelturm has been erected on the hills with a view of the Müggelsee and the Berlin-Müggelberge TV Tower.

See also
 Müggelheim
 Müggelsee

References

External links

Parks in Berlin
Treptow-Köpenick
Hills of Berlin